財閥 is an East Asian word which means "business conglomerate" or "financial magnate". 

財閥 may refer to:

Zaibatsu, Japanese business conglomerates that controlled significant parts of the Japanese economy throughout the Edo and Meiji periods
Chaebol, large Korean family-controlled, government-assisted corporate groups